Robert Quinton (born 15 May 1963) is a Jamaican sailor. He competed in the men's 470 event at the 1992 Summer Olympics.

References

External links
 

1963 births
Living people
Jamaican male sailors (sport)
Olympic sailors of Jamaica
Sailors at the 1992 Summer Olympics – 470
Place of birth missing (living people)